Osthe (The Best) is a 2011 Indian Tamil-language action comedy film directed by S. Dharani, a remake of the 2010 Bollywood film Dabangg. It starred Silambarasan, Richa Gangopadhyay, Sonu Sood, Jithan Ramesh, Santhanam, VTV Ganesh, Nassar and Revathi. Osthe tells the story of a fearless police officer, "Osthi" Velan (Silambarasan), and his troubled relationship with his stepfather and half-brother as he embarks on a mission to take down a corrupt politician. Sonu Sood reprised his role in Dabangg.

Produced by Balaji Real Media, Renny Johnson and distributed by Reliance Entertainment, the film was launched at AVM Studios in Chennai in May 2011; principal photography began in Mysore the following month. Its music was composed by Sai Thaman, with cinematography by Gopinath and editing by V. T. Vijayan. The film was released worldwide on 8 December 2011 to generally-mixed reviews from critics, and became a lukewarm box-office hit.

Plot
 
The film starts off with a boy named Velan who lives with his mother, stepbrother Balan and stepfather. Velan dislikes both his step father and stepbrother.

15 years later, Boxer Daniel, who is a politician who tries to win the by election by giving money to 14 villages in his constituency. When his goons are about to distribute money to the 14 villages, Velan who is now a police officer, by the name Osthi Velan, fights with Daniel's goons and confiscates the money.  It shows that Velan is still hates his stepbrother Balan and stepfather. Balan falls in love with Nirmala but his father disapproves his relationship because he acquired loan to start an oil mill and he can repay it only if Balan gets married to a rich girl.

Meanwhile, Boxer Daniel gets angry since the money has not been distributed yet and he tries to contact his goons. Then the goons try to find Osthi Velan's house to get the money back but they accidentally go to Kattupakam Police Station and a chase ensues between them and Osthi Velan's police forces.

During the chase Osthi Velan falls in love with a girl named Neduvalli who has a father who is an alcoholic. Daniel's goons then return to him and he gets angry with them just because they lost the money and when he investigates about the money to them they reveal that an inspector named Osthi Velan took away the money and Daniel tries to get the money back by using the collector's support. After then, Osthi Velan and a colleague, Selvam reach the collector's office but Osthi Velan regrets to give the money to the collector and he fools around with him.

The collector then contacts Daniel telling that Osthi Velan is not a normal person. Then Daniel goes to confront Osthi Velan in his check post but Osthi Velan shows off his attitude to Daniel which makes Daniel get tensed. Daniel hires a contract killer to kill Osthi Velan.

Balan steals the money from Velan's to marry Nirmala and after then he gives the money to her dad and her dad accepts their marriage. During the next scene Osthi Velan asks for Neduvalli hand in marriage to which she says no just because she has to take care of her drunkard father.

Then Osthi Velan goes to his house and finds his mother dead. At his mother's funeral he asks his stepfather and brother if he can join him and be happy which they both regret to and say no.

Then the next scene takes place in a train station where Osthi Velan is being attacked by the contract killer's goons he fights and kills the contract killer and lies to the Police Commissioner that the contract killer was hiding in the train station to kill Daniel. Daniel then makes a plan to keep Osthi Velan as his personal bodyguard and that plan also fails.

Then Osthi Velan asks Neduvalli's dad that he wants to marry her and her dad accepts to get his daughter married. When Velan leaves he commits suicide since his daughter would not accept while he is alive. Then Osthi Velan takes Neduvalli to Balan's wedding and he stops his marriage and marries Neduvalli.

Osthi Velan's father is ashamed of him now but Osthi Velan shows his aggression to his father. Right after then Daniel speaks to the minister about Osthi Velan and he tells the minister to suspend Osthi Velan but the minister tells Daniel that he needs a reason to suspend to Osthi Velan.

Balan then beats up a guy working in his father's factory just because he messed up something in the factory. When this matter is taken to Osthi Velan, a physical altercation between him and Balan ensues. Now, the people of Kattupakam wants Osthi Velan to be suspended as a result of this incident. He then apologizes to Balan.

After then, the minister calls Osthi Velan to his house and tells him that he has been suspended but Velan tells the minister that he will win in the election take the minister job right after then the minister takes away the suspend order from Osthi Velan and join hands with him.

Osthi Velan then poisons people drinking in the bar with Daniel's adulterated alcohol. Then he raids the place where Daniel is at right now and takes the additional money away also. In retaliation, Daniel burns Balan's father's factory and as a result, gets a heart attack.

Then Daniel makes Balan his henchman and he tells him to give fruits to the minister's house but after then it explodes and he realises that he did the wrong thing. Daniel then tells Balan to kill Osthi Velan so he goes to Osthi Velan's home but doesn't kill him and Osthi Velan fakes his death. During the next day he pays a visit to his father at the hospital then pays the money for the operation.

Daniel is now proud of Balan but he reveals that he was the one who killed Osthi Velan's mom right after then he holds Balan as a hostage then a chase happens between Daniel and Osthi Velan. Osthi Velan rescues Balan and kills Daniel. In the end Balan marries Nirmala.

Cast

 Silambarasan as Inspector "Osthe" Velan
 Richa Gangopadhyay as Neduvaali Velan
 Sonu Sood as Boxer Daniel
 Jithan Ramesh as Balan, Velu's brother
 Saranya Mohan as Nirmala, Balan's love interest
 Santhanam as Constable Selvam
 Nassar as Subbaiah Pillai, Osthe and Balan's father
 Revathi as Osthe and Balan's mother
 VTV Ganesh as Neduvaali's father
 Nizhalgal Ravi as Nirmala's father
 Vijayakumar as Minister Kalaipandian
 Thambi Ramaiah as Maasaana Moorthi
 Mayilsamy as Sennamadan
 Vaiyapuri as a constable
 Naren Narayanan as Police Commissioner Alexander
 Azhagam Perumal as Shankaralingam
 Bava Lakshmanan as Veeralingam, Selvam's sidekick
 Karate Raja as Boxer's henchman
 Bala Singh as District Collector
 Senthi Kumari as Masana Moorthy's wife
 Rithu Mangal as a journalist
 Nagesh Krishnamoorthy as an astrologer
 Robert (in the song "Neduvaali")
 S. Dharani as himself (in the song "Osthe Maamey")
 Mallika Sherawat as herself (in the song "Kalasala")

Production

Casting
After considering Bollywood actresses Sonakshi Sinha and Sonam Kapoor, Bengali actress Richa Gangopadhyay (who had starred in a number of Telugu films) was cast as Osthe's love interest. Jithan Ramesh was cast as Balan, and Sonu Sood reprised his role in the original film. Reports that Madhu Shalini had been signed to play Balan's girlfriend were dismissed by Silambarasan, who said that Saranya Mohan was cast in the role. Producer-turned-actor VTV Ganesh, after collaborations with Silambarasan in Vinnaithaandi Varuvaayaa and Vaanam was signed to play Nirmala's father (played by Mahesh Manjrekar in the original film). The production team took some time to finalise the actress for the film's item number. Nayantara, Shriya Saran, Zarine Khan, Katrina Kaif, Bipasha Basu, Deepika Padukone, Mallika Sherawat and Vidya Balan were reportedly considered, and Sherawat was eventually cast.

Filming
The project was launched with a pooja at AVM Productions in Chennai on 10 May 2011, and filming began on 26 June in Mysore. Nearly all of the film was shot in and around Mysore in a single shooting schedule, which was finished by mid-August. Silambarasan began a fitness regime with workouts at the gym, unlike Salman Khan (who went on a special diet to lose his six-pack abs). The film's final shooting schedule was a song filmed in Dubai. Mallika Sherawat shot the item number "Kalasala" in late September and the first week of October in Chennai.

Music

The soundtrack was initially planned to be released on 6 October 2011 (coinciding with Vijayadashami), but the release ceremony was held on 28 October in Chennai. The event was attended by the film's cast and crew, and other celebrities. Vijay, who had worked with Dharani in Ghilli (2004) and Kuruvi (2008), was the guest of honour and unveiled the film's soundtrack CD.

The soundtrack album contains five songs, with lyrics by Vaali and Yugabharathi; Silambarasan wrote the lyrics for "Pondaati". About the song, Silambarasan said that it revolves around a "husband's praise for his wife." "Pondaati" and "Neduvaali" (sung by Rahul Nambiar and Mahathi) are reminiscent of Thaman's compositions for the Telugu film Mirapakaay (2011), and "Kalasala" resembles the song "Munni Badnaam Hui" from Dabangg. Although Shruti Haasan was rumoured to have sung "Kalasala", veteran singer L. R. Eswari provided the vocal. Elements of "Kalasala Kalasala" were sampled in "Don't Sell Out" by rapper Tinie Tempah.

Release 
Osthe was released on 8 December 2011, which coincided with Karthikai Deepam. The film, released on over 110 screens overseas, was the largest-ever overseas release in Silambarasan's career; the actor called it the "biggest action film that he has done so far". A Telugu-dubbed version was planned to be released in April 2015 but was cancelled due to remake plans.

Reception

Critical reception
Osthe opened to mixed reviews. A New Indian Express reviewer said, "Unfortunately it's unable to recreate the same magic of the earlier version, the film a passable routine masala entertainer" and the film lacked the punch in original. A Deccan Chronicle reviewer gave the film three stars and said, "Osthe is worth watching once." Malathi Rangarajan of thehindu.com said, "If Dabangg could make it, Osthe should! And if Salman could do it, so can STR." Pavithra Srinivasan of Rediff rated the film two out of five: "Osthe lacks the magic that made Dabangg work." According to an IndiaGlitz.com reviewer, "Osthe ends up as an entertainer." Behindwoods rated the film 2.5 out of five, calling it entertaining; Sify also called it a "time-pass entertainer." Rohit Ramachandran of Nowrunning.com rated the film two out of five, calling it "a snoozefest."

Box office
Osthi earned  3 crore worldwide on its opening day, and was reported as having a "flying start at the box office".

References

External links
 

2011 films
Indian action films
Tamil remakes of Hindi films
2011 action films
2011 masala films
Indian police films
Films set in Chennai
2010s Tamil-language films
Films scored by Thaman S
Films shot in Tirunelveli
Films shot in Mysore
Reliance Entertainment films
Films directed by Dharani